Mordellistena claggi is a beetle in the genus Mordellistena of the family Mordellidae. It was described in 1936 by Ray.

References

claggi
Beetles described in 1936